New Haven High School can refer to:
 New Haven High School (Connecticut)
 New Haven High School (Indiana)
 New Haven High School (Michigan)
 New Haven High School (Missouri)